Minervarya kirtisinghei (Kirtisinghe's frog) is a species of frog in the family Dicroglossidae. It is endemic to Sri Lanka where it is found in the montane south-central to lowland southwestern areas.

Minervarya kirtisinghei is a common frog. They occur in tropical forests, savanna, grasslands and wetlands, in both montane and lowland areas, as well as in some human-made habitats like rubber and palm oil plantations and home gardens. Adults are semi-aquatic whereas the larvae are aquatic.

References

kirtisinghei
Frogs of Sri Lanka
Endemic fauna of Sri Lanka
Amphibians described in 1996
Taxonomy articles created by Polbot
Taxobox binomials not recognized by IUCN